Adaville is an unincorporated community in Plymouth County, in the U.S. state of Iowa.

History
 The first post office in Adaville opened sometime prior to 1857, and was discontinued in May 1857. Adaville's second post office opened in 1889.

The community's population was 6 in 1900. The Adaville post office closed in 1904.

Adaville's population was 18 in 1920. By 1940, Adaville's population was 10.

References

Unincorporated communities in Plymouth County, Iowa
Unincorporated communities in Iowa